Michael Palaiologos (born 1337) was the second son of Byzantine emperor Andronikos III Palaiologos (reigned 1328–1341).

Little is known of Michael's life. He was born in 1337, during his father's reign, and was hence styled a porphyrogennetos. Sometime before Andronikos III's death in 1341, Michael was raised to the supreme court rank of Despot. In 1351/52, when his elder brother, Emperor John V Palaiologos (r. 1341–1391), was engaged in a struggle for the throne with Matthew Kantakouzenos, John V, who sought aid from the Serbian Emperor Stephen Dushan (r. 1331–1355), sent him as a hostage to the Serbian court. Nothing further is heard of him.

References

Sources
 
 

1337 births
14th-century Byzantine people
Despots (court title)
Michael
Porphyrogennetoi
Year of death unknown
14th-century deaths
Sons of Byzantine emperors